The Biecz Synagogue is a former synagogue in Biecz, Poland. It is located on the main square of the town. Built in 1903, it is now used as a public library.

History
The synagogue was built in 1903, with two separate entrances: one for men, which leads to the ground floor, and another one for women, which leads to the first floor. By the early 1930s, the town of Biecz was home to 500 Jews, making up 15% of the entire population.

During World War II, the Nazis established a Jewish ghetto around the synagogue. Eventually, they killed 150 Jews and deported the remaining Jews to the Bełżec extermination camp.

In the 1990s, the US-based Society of Jews from Biecz in New York added a commemorative plaque to the building.

References

External links
Biecz, Poland, A house that once served as a synagogue. on the Yad Vashem website

Former synagogues in Poland
Synagogues completed in 1903
Public libraries in Poland
20th-century religious buildings and structures in Poland